Francis Richard Lubbock (October 16, 1815June 22, 1905) was the ninth Governor of Texas and was in office during the American Civil War.  He was the brother of Thomas Saltus Lubbock, for whom Lubbock County, Texas, and the eponymous county seat are named.

Early life
Francis Lubbock was born on October 16, 1815, to Dr. Henry Thomas Willis and Susan Ann (Saltus) Lubbock in Beaufort, South Carolina. Although his family moved to Charleston shortly after he was born, Lubbock would return to Beaufort for his adolescent years while attending boarding school.

Lubbock was a businessman in South Carolina before moving to Texas in 1836. During the Republic of Texas period, President Sam Houston appointed Lubbock to be comptroller.

Career
In 1857, Lubbock was elected lieutenant governor of Texas as a Democrat, but failed in his re-election bid in 1859.  Following the Confederate secession in 1861, Lubbock won the governorship of Texas. During his tenure, he supported Confederate conscription, working to draft all able-bodied men, including resident aliens, into the Confederate States Army. He was known to praise the Great Hanging at Gainesville, where in October 1862, some 42 suspected Unionists were murdered, convicted and killed by hanging through sentences by a "Citizens Court" organized by Texas state troops, but not recognized under state law, with some 14 lynched without benefit even of a show trial. It was part of an outbreak of violence, often caused by Confederate or state troops, in North Texas in the early years of the war.

When Lubbock's term ended in 1863, he joined the Confederate Army. He was commissioned as a lieutenant colonel, serving under Major General John B. Magruder. By 1864, Lubbock was promoted to aide-de-camp for Jefferson Davis. Following the Confederacy's military collapse, Lubbock fled from Richmond, Virginia, with Davis. They were soon caught by Union troops in Georgia. He was imprisoned at Fort Delaware with John Reagan and Jefferson Davis for eight months before being paroled.

On his return to Texas, Lubbock continued to pursue business interests in Houston and Galveston.  From 1878 to 1891, he served as Texas State Treasurer.

Death and legacy
Lubbock died in Austin on June 22, 1905, at the age of 89, making him the last Confederate Governor to die. He is buried at Texas State Cemetery in Austin.

References

External links

 Read an entry about Francis R. Lubbock from the Biographical Encyclopedia of Texas published 1880, hosted by the Portal to Texas History.
 Sketch of  Lubbock from A pictorial history of Texas, from the earliest visits of European adventurers, to A.D. 1879, hosted by the Portal to Texas History.

1815 births
1905 deaths
Democratic Party governors of Texas
Lieutenant Governors of Texas
Politicians from Houston
People from Beaufort, South Carolina
People of Texas in the American Civil War
State treasurers of Texas
American Civil War prisoners of war
History of Lubbock, Texas
Confederate States Army officers
Confederate States of America state governors
19th-century American politicians
Lubbock County, Texas
Lubbock, Texas
19th-century American businesspeople
Military personnel from Texas